Justice Grimke may refer to:

Frederick Grimke, associate justice of the Ohio Supreme Court
John Faucheraud Grimké, associate justice of the South Carolina Court of Common Pleas and General Sessions